Pakashticë (Pakaštica) is a village in north-eastern Kosovo, in the north of the municipality of Podujevo.

It is the birthplace of the former President of Kosovo, Fatmir Sejdiu.

Notes and references 

Notes:

References:

Villages in Podujevo